Jawahar Navodaya Vidyalaya, Silvassa or locally known as JNV Silvassa is a boarding, co-educational  school in Union territory of Dadra and Nagar Haveli in India. Navodaya Vidyalayas are funded by the Indian Ministry of Human Resources Development and administered  by Navodaya Vidyalaya Smiti, an autonomous body under the ministry.

History 
The school was established in 1986, and is a part of Jawahar Navodaya Vidyalaya schools which provide free education to gifted children. This school is administered and monitored by Pune regional office of Navodaya Vidyalaya Smiti.

Admission 
Admission to JNV Silvassa at class VI level is made through selection test conducted by Navodaya Vidyalaya Smiti. The information about test is disseminated and advertised in Dadra and Nagar Haveli by the office of Dadra and Nagar Haveli district magistrate (Collector), who is also chairperson of Vidyalya Management Committee(VMC).

Affiliations 
JNV Silvassa is affiliated to Central Board of Secondary Education with affiliation number 3040001.

See also 
 Jawahar Navodaya Vidyalaya, Daman
 List of JNV schools

References

External links 

 Official Website of JNV Silvassa

Silvassa
Silvassa
Educational institutions established in 1986
1986 establishments in Dadra and Nagar Haveli
Schools in Dadra and Nagar Haveli and Daman and Diu